Mikael Johnston is a musician, producer and remixer best known for his work in electronic dance music. Johnston is a founding member of the San Francisco house music group Mephisto Odyssey which originated in the early 1990s. After a string of successful singles on his own label imprint Mephisto Records (starting with the 12" Dream of The Black Dahlia), Johnston signed with progressive west coast label City of Angels, home to future break beat kings The Crystal Method.  Johnston's notoriety in the major label music industry began in the late 1990s with his collaboration with Jane's Addiction on a series of remixes for their maxi single "So What" under the name Deep Red. A recording contract with Warner Bros. Records soon followed. While at Warner Johnston worked with Nu Metal act Static-X on a remix for their single Push It. This eventually led to their collaboration on the crossover alternative song, "Crash" which later became a video directed by Len Wiseman that appeared on MTV and in the film Batman Beyond: Return of the Joker. Johnston's other projects include, Deep Red, Seraphim and The Swerve.

Currently Johnston is one half of the electronic dance music duo Dresden and Johnston with Dave Dresden formerly of Gabriel and Dresden.  Dresden and Johnston's remixes of Lily Allen and Nadia Ali both hit #1 in the Billboard Magazine Hot Dance Club Play Chart in 2009. Other remixes by the duo include BT "The Unbreakable", JD Webb "Better Man", The Crystal Method "Black Rainbows" and Owl City "Hello Seattle".

References

American house musicians
Musicians from San Francisco
20th-century American musicians
Living people
21st-century American musicians
1973 births